The Cruyff turn (also spelled Cruijff turn in the Netherlands) is an evasive dribbling move used in football, and named after Dutch player Johan Cruyff. 

In the 24th minute of the game against Sweden in the group stage of the 1974 World Cup, while Cruyff had control of the ball in an attacking position but was facing his own goal and being guarded tightly by Swedish defender Jan Olsson, Cruyff feigned a pass before dragging the ball behind his standing leg, turning 180 degrees, and accelerating away. With its simplicity, effectiveness and unpredictability, the Cruyff turn remains one of the most commonly recognized dribbling moves in modern football.

The fact that the feint was named after Cruyff, however, does not mean that Cruyff was the first to perform this move. Just like with most evasive dribbles, feints and tricks, the first footballer to perform it, is almost always impossible to trace down.

See also

Marseille turn
Pelé runaround move

References

External links
BBC Guide to the Cruyff turn

Association football skills
Association football terminology
Johan Cruyff

it:Glossario calcistico#G